"Hapworth 16, 1924" is a short story by the American author J. D. Salinger, the last original work published in his lifetime. It appeared in the June 19, 1965, edition of The New Yorker, infamously taking up almost the entire magazine. It is the "youngest" of Salinger's Glass family stories, in the sense that the narrated events happen chronologically before those in the rest of the series.   

Both contemporary and later literary critics harshly panned "Hapworth 16, 1924"; writing in The New York Times, Michiko Kakutani called it "a sour, implausible and, sad to say, completely charmless story .... filled with digressions, narcissistic asides and ridiculous shaggy-dog circumlocutions." Even kind critics have regarded the work as "a long-winded sob story" that many have found "simply unreadable", and it has been speculated that this response was the reason Salinger decided to quit publishing. But Salinger is also said to have considered the story a "high point of his writing" and made tentative steps to have it reprinted, though those came to nothing.

Plot
The story is presented in the form of a letter from camp written by a seven-year-old Seymour Glass (the main character of "A Perfect Day for Bananafish"). In this respect, the plot is identical to Salinger's previous unpublished story "The Ocean Full of Bowling Balls", written 18 years earlier in 1947. In the course of requesting an inordinate quantity of reading matter from home, Seymour predicts his brother's success as a writer as well as his own death and offers critical assessments of a number of major writers.

Publishing history
After the story's appearance in The New Yorker, Salinger—who had already withdrawn to his home in New Hampshire—stopped publishing altogether. Since the story never appeared in book form, readers had to seek out that issue or find it on microfilm. Finally, with the release of The Complete New Yorker on DVD in 2005, the story was once again widely available.

In 1996, Orchises Press, a small Virginia publishing house, started a process of publishing "Hapworth" in book form. Orchises Press owner Roger Lathbury has described the effort in The Washington Post and, three months after Salinger's death, in New York magazine. According to Lathbury, Salinger was deeply concerned with the proposed book's appearance, even visiting Washington to examine the cloth for the binding. Salinger also sent Lathbury numerous "infectious and delightful and loving" letters.

Following publishing norms, Lathbury applied for Library of Congress Cataloging in Publication data, unaware of how publicly available the information would be. A writer in Seattle, researching an article on Jeff Bezos, came across the "Hapworth" publication date, and told his sister, a journalist for the Washington Business Journal, who wrote an article about the upcoming book. This led to substantial coverage in the press. Shortly before the books were to be shipped, Salinger changed his mind, and Orchises withdrew the book. New publication dates were repeatedly announced, but it never appeared. Lathbury said, "I never reached back out. I thought about writing some letters, but it wouldn't have done any good."

Citations

References

Lathbury, Roger "Betraying Salinger", New York, April 4, 2010. Retrieved on May 22, 2010.
Lundegaard, Karen M. (2010) "J. D. Salinger resurfaces ... in Alexandria?", Washington Business Journal, November 15, 1996. Retrieved on August 13, 2008.
Lundegaard, Erik (1996) Three Stories with J. D. Salinger
Noah, Timothy. "Hapworth 16, 1924: A Chatterbox Investigation", Slate, September 11, 2000. Retrieved on August 10, 2008.

External links
Abstract at The New Yorker site
Still Paging Mr. Salinger at The New York Times
"Hapworth 16, 1924" Revisited at The Satirist: America's Most Critical Journal

Short stories by J. D. Salinger
1965 short stories
Cancelled books
Works originally published in The New Yorker